The Lacandon sea catfish (Potamarius nelsoni) is a species of catfish in the family Ariidae. It was described by Barton Warren Evermann and Edmund Lee Goldsborough in 1902, originally under the genus Conorhynchos. It is known from the Usumacinta River, in Mexico.

References

Ariidae
Taxa named by Barton Warren Evermann
Fish described in 1902